Other Women's Husbands is a lost 1926 American comedy film directed by Erle C. Kenton and written by Edward T. Lowe Jr. and Jack Wagner. The film stars Monte Blue, Marie Prevost, Huntley Gordon, Phyllis Haver, Marjorie Whiteis and John Patrick. The film was released by Warner Bros. on March 17, 1926.

Cast      
Monte Blue as Dick Lambert
Marie Prevost as Kay Lambert
Huntley Gordon as Jack Harding 
Phyllis Haver as Roxana
Marjorie Whiteis as Roxana's Friend 
John Patrick as Dick's Chum

References

External links
 

1926 films
1920s English-language films
Silent American comedy films
Warner Bros. films
Films directed by Erle C. Kenton
American silent feature films
American black-and-white films
Lost American films
1926 comedy films
1926 lost films
Lost comedy films
1920s American films